Koza İpek Holding is a Turkish conglomerate. It includes twelve companies, three of them are publicly traded and mining companies Koza Altın and Koza Anadolu (Koza Anadolu Metal Madencilik Isletmeleri AS, quoted as KOZAA) and İpek Dogal Energy IPEKEE.

Koza Gold Operations Company
Koza Gold Operations Company is a Turkish company founded to explore and operate gold mines in Turkey. KOZA IPEK GROUP has acquired all the shares of Normandy Madencilik A.S. from Newmont Mining Corporation Limited in March 2005 thus becoming first Turkish company in the history of Republic of Turkey to realize gold production in this country.

Koza Anadolu Metal Madencilik İşletmeleri A.Ş.
Koza Anadolu Metal Madencilik is an affiliated corporate company of KOZA-IPEK HOLDING that aims for continuous development and exploration, developing and production of copper, lead-zinc, iron and similar mineral mining reserves.

Following a court order, since 26 October 2015, the Koza group companies are managed by trustees appointed by SDIF.

References

External links
 Koza İpek Holding

Conglomerate companies of Turkey
Mass media companies of Turkey
Newspaper companies of Turkey
Conglomerate companies established in 1948
Companies listed on the Istanbul Stock Exchange
Holding companies of Turkey
Holding companies established in 1948
Mass media freedom in Turkey
Turkish companies established in 1948
Companies formerly affiliated with the Gülen movement